Zevulun Charlop (born December 14, 1929) is an American rabbi, currently serving as Dean Emeritus of Rabbi Isaac Elchanan Theological Seminary, an affiliate of Yeshiva University.

He has served as president of the American Committee for the United Charities in Israel, General Israel Orphans Home for Girls in Jerusalem, and the National Council of Young Israel Rabbis.

Rabbi Charlop is the editor of three collections of novellae on Torah and Talmud by his late father, the noted Rabbi Jechiel Michael Charlop, and is the grandson of Rabbi Yaakov Moshe Charlap. He served for many years as the spiritual leader of the Young Israel of Mosholu Parkway (Bronx, NY), until the Synagogue closed.

In May 2008, Rabbi Charlop received Yeshiva University's Presidential Medallion in recognition of his stewardship of RIETS. Under his distinguished leadership of more than 35 years, the seminary experienced enormous growth, graduating thousands of rabbis, educators, and Jewish scholars.

In September 2008, Rabbi Charlop was honored for his extraordinary achievement in Torah learning and leadership as the seminary's dean at Yeshiva University's RIETS Annual Dinner of Tribute.  Sefer Zeved Tov, a collection of essays by Roshei Yeshiva and students in his honor, was published for this occasion. Additionally, Sefer Shefa Yamim, a collection of many of Rabbi Charlop's essays, was published in limited release for this occasion.

As [dean emeritus], Rabbi Charlop continues to give semicha exit bechinos, serves as one of RIETS’ Masmichim, and maintains his special relationship with the Kollelei Elyon. He also serves as special advisor to the YU President on yeshiva affairs with cabinet rank.

References

External links
Yeshiva University: Rabbi Zevulun Charlop, MA

Yeshiva University faculty
Living people
Orthodox rabbis from New York City
1929 births
21st-century American Jews